Romantics Anonymous is a 2010 French-Belgian romantic comedy film directed by Jean-Pierre Améris and starring Benoît Poelvoorde and Isabelle Carré. It received three nominations at the 2nd Magritte Awards, winning Best Foreign Film in Coproduction.

Plot
Angélique is a young French woman who suffers from social anxiety disorder and is afraid of just about everything. She regularly attends a support group for other people like her. Jean-René, who owns a small manufacturer of chocolate called the Chocolate Mill, also suffers from social anxiety, and is afraid of many things, particularly intimacy. The Chocolate Mill is failing because it makes a plain, old-fashioned kind of chocolate that no longer sells well.

Angélique had attended pastry school to fulfill her dream of becoming a chocolate maker. However, her anxiety prevented her from being able to answer questions or write exams. Luckily, a fellow sufferer of social anxiety disorder, Mr. Mercier, hired her to make chocolates for his tearoom and shop, Mercier Sweetshop. For Angélique to remain anonymous, Mr. Mercier told his customers that the chocolates were made by a hermit who lived in seclusion in the mountains. She thrived there for seven years.

When Mr. Mercier dies, Angélique applies for a job at the Chocolate Mill. Due to some misunderstandings, Jean-René hires her as a sales representative. When Angélique realizes that the company will go bankrupt if they do not improve the quality of their chocolate, she helps the other employees in making a new line of chocolate, claiming she has a way to communicate with the hermit chocolate maker.

At the same time, Angélique and Jean-René fall in love, but have substantial difficulties expressing their feelings and developing their relationship due to their fears and anxieties.

In the meantime, the other Chocolate Mill employees grow suspicious about Angélique's "connection" with the famous secret chocolate maker. Ultimately, with a little help from the other Chocolate Mill employees and Angélique's support group, Angélique is revealed as the hermit chocolate maker, and the Chocolate Mill becomes successful. Jean-René and Angélique finally consummate their relationship. The couple find an alternative way of coping with the stresses of wedding and remain together forever after.

Cast
Benoît Poelvoorde as Jean-René Van Den Hugde
Isabelle Carré as Angélique Delange
Lorella Cravotta as Magda
Jacques Boudet as Rémi
Pierre Niney as Ludo
Alice Pol as Adèle
Lise Lamétrie as Suzanne
Swann Arlaud as Antoine
Philippe Laudenbach as The jury president
Stéphan Wojtowicz as The psychologist

Reception
The film has been positively received by critics and holds a rating of 86% on Rotten Tomatoes.

Romantics Anonymous is a real-life help group that helps people with sometimes debilitating shyness. Jean-Pierre Améris, a highly emotional person himself, who attended real EA (Emotions Anonymous) meetings, and Isabelle Carré had talked about making a movie about their shared shyness. As preparation for the movie, Isabelle Carré also attended EA meetings.

Stage musical adaptation 
A stage musical based on the film was adapted and directed by Emma Rice with music by Michael Kooman and Christopher Dimond. The musical premiered at the Sam Wanamaker Playhouse in London from 20 October 2017, running until 6 January 2018.

References

External links

 
 
 

2010 films
Belgian romantic comedy films
2010s French-language films
2010 romantic comedy films
Films directed by Jean-Pierre Améris
Magritte Award winners
Pan-Européenne films
French romantic comedy films
French-language Belgian films
2010s French films